Victoria Hanna (Hebrew: ויקטוריה חנה; a stage name consisting of her first and middle names) is a multi-disciplinary artist, voice and language explorer, composer and creator active in both the Israeli and international spheres..

Biography
Victoria Hanna was brought up in an ultra-Orthodox Mizrahi Jewish family in Jerusalem by an Egyptian rabbi father and a Persian mother. She stuttered as a child. She was born in and lives in Jerusalem, and has three children. She studied acting in Nissan Nativ's acting studio.

Music career 
Hanna composes all of her songs. She released her first video single, a song called "Aleph Bet", the name of the Hebrew alphabet, in February 2015. It went viral on YouTube, with over million hits. Hanna's second video single, which she came out with later in 2015, is "22 Letters." It has been described as Kabbalistic rap, and is based on Sefer Yetzira (the Book of Formation, or Book of Creation). Forbes listed her as one of Israel's 50 most influential women in 2015. She promoted her debut album in 2017.

Hanna sang in the Opening Ceremonies of the 2017 Maccabiah Games.

See also
Music of Israel

References

Relevant literature
 Busau, Filip. 2016. Victoria Hannas Kunst: Zwischen Gebet, Popkultur und Interpretation. Freie Universität Berlin, Institut für Judaistik.

External links
Official website
Victoria Hanna on Facebook
ויקטוריה חנה Victoria Hanna on YouTube

Living people
21st-century Israeli  women singers
Israeli women singer-songwriters
Israeli people of Iranian-Jewish descent
Israeli people of Egyptian-Jewish descent
Jewish singers
Year of birth missing (living people)
Israeli Mizrahi Jews
Mizrahi singers